Joe Montione (born 1954), better known as Banana Joe, is an American radio personality.

Banana Joe may also refer to:
Banana Joe (film), a 1982 Italian action-comedy film
Banana Joe (character), a fictional character from The Amazing World of Gumball
Banana Joe V Tani Kazari, a toy Affenpinscher dog and championship winner